Tajuria igolotiana is a butterfly of the family Lycaenidae first described by Siuiti Murayama and Hachiro Okamura in 1973. It is endemic to the Philippines and found on Luzon, Mindoro and Mindanao islands. The forewing length is 17–19 mm. Subspecies T. i. fumiae is distributed on Mindanao.

References

 Hayashi, Hisakazu, 1984: New Synonyms, New Status, New Combinations, New Species and New Subspecies of Butterflies from the Philippines and Indonesia (Lepidoptera: Satyridae, Riodinidae, Lycaenidae). IWASE. 2:9-34.
 Treadaway, Colin G., 1955: Checklist of the butterflies of the Philippine Islands. Nachrichten des Entomologischen Vereins Apollo, Suppl. 14: 7–118.

 , 2012: Revised checklist of the butterflies of the Philippine Islands (Lepidoptera: Rhopalocera). Nachrichten des Entomologischen Vereins Apollo, Suppl. 20: 1-64.

Butterflies described in 1973
Tajuria